Rachel Blankenship or Rachel Thun Ríos (born September 2, 1995), née Thun, is an American soccer player who plays as a midfielder for Fortuna Tulsa in the Women's Premier Soccer League and for the Puerto Rico national team.

Career
Blankenship played college soccer at the University of Tulsa from 2014 to 2017. For the 2014 season, she was named as the American Athletic Conference Rookie of the Year. In 2016, she was named the American Athletic Conference Midfielder of the Year. She was selected to the American Athletic Conference First Team All-Conference in 2014, 2015, 2016, and 2017. She is the first player in TU history to be tabbed to the American Athletic Conference First Team all four years.

Blankenship was Tulsa's Offensive Player of the Year in 2014, 2015, 2016, and 2017.
She was also the recipient of The National Academic Momentum Award in 2016, 
and was awarded The University of Tulsa Ultimate Team Award in 2017 and 2018. 
Rachel was named to the American Athletic Conference All-Academic Team in 2015, 2016, and 2017 
and was a nominee for the Senior CLASS Award in 2017.

She joined Fortuna Tulsa in 2018.

International career
Blankenship's maternal grandparents, the Ríos family, are from Puerto Rico. Having been born in Oklahoma City, she was therefore eligible to play for the United States or Puerto Rico. She chose the latter in 2017.

She played for Puerto Rico at 2018 CONCACAF Women's Championship qualification.

Blankenship traveled to Uruguay in June of 2021 to play in friendly matches against 
the Uruguay National Team. She was accompanied by her husband and 6 month old daughter 
and is the first mother to play for the Puerto Rican National Team.

Personal life
She married Malachi Blankenship in June 2017 and has two children, River (born November 12, 2020) and Barek (born September 25, 2022). 
Blankenship currently holds the position as Assistant Coach for The University of Tulsa Women's Soccer Team 
in Tulsa, Oklahoma where she and her husband are active members of their church and the Tulsa community.

References

External links
 Tulsa Golden Hurricane bio

1995 births
Living people
Puerto Rican women's footballers
Puerto Rico women's international footballers
Sportspeople from Oklahoma City
American sportspeople of Puerto Rican descent
American women's soccer players
Soccer players from Oklahoma
Women's association football midfielders
Tulsa Golden Hurricane women's soccer players